Belman was a company based in Australia that made guitars.

They have recently shut down, thus leaving only a few of their last guitars out there. Their bodies are made of exotic timbers which are often embellished with well-figured tops.
It is possible that the recent closing of Belman guitars will cause an uprise in the cost of a well-maintained model.

History 
Belman guitars were handmade in Melbourne, Australia from 1994 to 2007.
 
Tony first built a guitar as a school project with classmate Craig Manger in 1982. They subsequently collaborated in a guitar repair business and began also making custom instruments. They officially formed Belman Guitars in 1994. The name coming from combining their surnames; Bel(l)-Man(ger).

Belman experimented with various exotic Australian timbers and colouring effects. They also hand-wound custom pickups. The company eventually relocated to their first full factory in Thomastown, Victoria. They initially offered 4 models, three guitars in the Double Cutaway, Hornet and Albatross, and a bass model, and over 18 variations were available based on these.

Belman stopped producing early in 2007.

See also

List of acoustic guitar brands
List of electric guitar brands

Further reading 
 Jedistar Belman Page

Musical instrument manufacturing companies of Australia
Guitar manufacturing companies
Manufacturing companies based in Melbourne
Australian companies established in 1994